Armand Vallin Feigenbaum (April 6, 1920 – November 13, 2014)  was an American quality control expert and businessman. He devised the concept of Total Quality Control which inspired Total Quality Management.

Biography

Feigenbaum, known as “Val”, received a bachelor's degree in industrial administration from Union College, his master's degree from the MIT Sloan School of Management, and his Ph.D. in Economics from MIT. He was Director of Manufacturing Operations at General Electric (1958–1968), and was later the President and CEO of General Systems Company of Pittsfield, Massachusetts, an engineering firm that helps companies define business operating systems. Feigenbaum wrote several books and served as president of the American Society for Quality (1961–1963). He worked closely with his brother, Donald S. Feigenbaum.

He died on November 13, 2014, at the age of 94.

Key ideas
Val Feigenbaum's contributions to the quality body of knowledge include:

"Total quality control is an effective system for integrating the quality development, quality maintenance, and quality improvement efforts of the various groups in an organization so as to enable production and service at the most economical levels which allow full customer satisfaction."
The concept of a "hidden" plant or factory, popularised in the 1970s: the idea that so much extra work is performed in correcting mistakes that there is effectively a hidden plant within any factory, potentially 20-40% of the total capacity.
Accountability for quality: because quality is everybody's job, it may become nobody's job. Central to this idea is that quality must be actively managed and have visibility at the highest levels of management.
The concept of quality cost: the cost of achieving quality plus the cost of absence of quality.
The time lag between the introduction of total quality initiatives inside the major companies within a country and their observed economic impact: for example, Japanese companies introduced quality initiatives in the 1950s which took effect in the Japanese economy in the 1970s and likewise the United States' quality initiatives from the 1980's saw an economic impact in the 1990s.
Quality is neither a department, nor a technique nor a philosophy. It is a fundamental way of managing.

Bibliography

References

External links

ASQ Feigenbaum Biography page

1920 births
American business theorists
American chief executives
2014 deaths
MIT School of Humanities, Arts, and Social Sciences alumni
MIT Sloan School of Management alumni
National Medal of Technology recipients
Quality experts
Union College (New York) alumni
Members of the United States National Academy of Engineering

20th-century American businesspeople